Kentucky Route 501 (KY 501) is a  state highway in Kentucky. KY 501's southern terminus is at KY 910 in Phil, and the northern terminus is at U.S. Route 27 (US 27) north-northeast of Waynesburg.

Major intersections

References

0501
Transportation in Casey County, Kentucky
Transportation in Lincoln County, Kentucky